The Brighton, Hove & District Football League was a football competition involving teams in and around Brighton, Hove and Worthing, in England. The league was established in 1903 and reached ten divisions in size by 1967. However, with the number of clubs slowly decreasing and the league reduced to only two divisions between 2011 and 2013, a merger with the Worthing & District League began in 2014, initially with a combined Premier Division. The merger was completed in 2015 with the establishment of the Brighton, Worthing & District League.

Prior to the league's disbanding, winners of the Premier Division were able to apply for promotion to the Sussex County League.

Champions

References

External links
Official website

 
Sport in Brighton and Hove
Defunct football leagues in England
1903 establishments in England
2014 disestablishments in England